Clifford Strange was an English architect.

He started out as an assistant of Thomas Tait in 1928 before setting up in practice himself.

Works

1935-40 Wembley Town Hall, Wembley Park
This was a competition winning scheme.  The submissions being judged by Stanley Hemp.  The completed building was subsequently covered in the architectural press,

References 

20th-century English architects
Possibly living people